Tyler Gauthier (born June 29, 1997) is an American football center who is a free agent. He played college football for the Miami Hurricanes and signed with the New England Patriots as an undrafted free agent in 2019.

College career 
Gauthier played college football for the Miami Hurricanes. During his time with the Hurricanes, he started 29 consecutive games and was named All-ACC Honorable Mention in 2017.

Professional career

New England Patriots
Gauthier went undrafted in the 2019 NFL Draft, and signed with the New England Patriots. After being waived as part of final roster cuts, and later signed to the Patriots practice squad on October 15, 2019. Gauthier was also drafted by the St. Louis BattleHawks of the XFL on the same day.

Jacksonville Jaguars
On December 10, 2019, Gauthier was signed by the Jacksonville Jaguars off the Patriots practice squad. He was waived on August 8, 2020.

New England Patriots (second stint)
Gauthier re-signed with the Patriots on August 12, 2020. He was waived on September 5, 2020.

Miami Dolphins
On September 16, 2020, Gauthier was signed to the Miami Dolphins' practice squad. He signed a reserve/future contract with the Dolphins on January 5, 2021. He was waived on July 16, 2021.

Buffalo Bills
Gauthier signed with the Buffalo Bills on July 30, 2021, but was waived on August 24, 2021.

Washington Football Team
Gauthier signed with the practice squad of the Washington Football Team on November 24, 2021, but was released two days later.

References 

1997 births
Living people
American football centers
Miami Hurricanes football players
New England Patriots players
People from Venice, Florida
Players of American football from Florida
Jacksonville Jaguars players
Miami Dolphins players
Buffalo Bills players
Washington Football Team players